WFKS (95.1 FM) is a Top 40 (CHR) station serving Florida's Space Coast area. The iHeartMedia outlet broadcasts with an ERP of 4.3 kW and is licensed to Melbourne, Florida.

History
The station was branded as 95.1 The Beat until March 14, 2007 with a rhythmic contemporary format.

On July 22, 2011, the station changed its call letters to WFKS, after those calls were dropped by sister station WKSL in Jacksonville earlier in the month upon that station's rebranding as "Radio NOW" (Now KISS FM).

References

External links
KISS 95.1 website

FKS
Contemporary hit radio stations in the United States
Radio stations established in 2000
IHeartMedia radio stations
2000 establishments in Florida